The following is a list of all suspensions and fines enforced in the National Hockey League (NHL) during the 2016–17 NHL season. It lists which players or coaches of what team have been punished for which offense and the amount of punishment they have received.

Based on each player's average annual salary, divided by number of days in the season (180) for first time offenders and games (82) for repeat offenders, salary will be forfeited for the term of their suspension. Players' money forfeited due to suspension or fine goes to the Players' Emergency Assistance Fund, while money forfeited by coaches, staff or organizations as a whole go to the NHL Foundation.

Suspensions
* - suspension carried over from 2015–16 season

† - suspension covered at least one 2016 NHL preseason game

‡ - suspension covered at least one 2017 postseason game

 - Player was considered a repeat offender under the terms of the Collective Bargaining Agreement (player had been suspended in the 18 months prior to this suspension)

 All figures are in US dollars.
 Suspension accompanied by mandatory referral to the NHL/NHLPA Program for Substance Abuse and Behavioral Health. Only sixteen games remained in the Arizona Coyotes season at the time of the suspension, so the remaining four games were served at the start of the 2016–17 NHL season; as he was mid-suspension, Tinordi was also barred from playing in any preseason games.
 As the Philadelphia Flyers were eliminated from the playoffs, Schenn's suspension was instead made to be served in his first three games of the 2016–17 NHL regular season.
 Suspension was appealed by Vermette and the NHLPA on February 16, 2017. On February 25, 2017, NHL Commissioner Gary Bettman announced he had heard the appeal and was upholding the original 10 game suspension levied to Vermette.
 This figures does not include salary forfeited for Tinordi's suspension, as that was accounted for last season.

Fines
Players can be fined up to 50% of one day's salary, up to a maximum of $10,000.00 for their first offense, and $15,000.00 for any subsequent offenses. Fines listed in italics indicate that was the maximum allowed fine.

Coaches, non-playing personnel, and teams are not restricted to such maximums.

Fines for players/coaches fined for diving/embellishment are structured uniquely and are only handed out after non-publicized warnings are given to the player/coach for their first offense. For more details on diving/embellishment fines:

 For coach incident totals, each citation issued to a player on his club counts toward his total.
 All figures are in US dollars.

 All figures are in US dollars.

Further reading

See also 
 2015–16 NHL suspensions and fines
 2017–18 NHL suspensions and fines
 2016 in sports
 2017 in sports
 2016–17 NHL season
 2016–17 NHL transactions

References

Suspension and Fines
National Hockey League suspensions and fines